Telul eth-Thalathat is an archaeological site located  west of Mosul and just east of Tal Afar in Nineveh Province (Iraq).

History of archaeological research

The site consists of at least five separate tells or settlement mounds. Telul eth-Thalathat was excavated for four seasons between 1956 and 1965 and again in 1976 by a team from the University of Tokyo Iraq-Iran Archaeological Expedition. The first two seasons, in 1956 and 1957, were  led by N. Egami and worked at Tell II. Burials, residential areas, and a presumed temple were uncovered. The final season was led by S. Fukai.

Occupation history
Telul eth-Thalathat was occupied in the Ubaid, Nineveh V, and Uruk periods, as well as during Middle Assyrian times. Excavations have revealed over 20 kilns and a number of burials, as well as some figurines and spindle whorls. There was also a small Neolithic settlement.

See also

 Cities of the ancient Near East

References

Further reading
Fukai, S. and T. Matsutani, Excavations at Telul eth-Thalathat, 1976, Sumer,  vol. 33, no. 1: pp. 48–64, 1977

External links
Pottery object from Telul eth-Thalathat at the University of Tokyo

Archaeological sites in Iraq
Nineveh Governorate
Tells (archaeology)